Dorny is the name of:

Surname 
Julia Dorny (born 1990), German athlete, media scientist and journalist 
Thérèse Dorny (1891–1976), French film and stage actress

Given name 
Dorny Romero (born 1995), Dominican footballer

See also 
 Dorney (surname)